Ice Music Festival Norway (initiated 2006 in Geilo, Norway) is a "glacial instrument" festival founded by Terje Isungset together with Pål Knutsson Medhus. Isungset had the idea behind the festival and remains the creative director. The festival is unique because everything, including the venue, instruments, and art, is made of ice and snow. The last three years, the festival has been located at Finse. For 2021, the festival will for the first time be arranged at Bergsjøstølen, Ål kommune. Around 30 volunteers and students work alongside ice carvers, designers, ice cutters, architects and artists for 10 days leading up to the festival to make adequate preparations.

Background 
The Ice Music Festival has been an annual event since 2006, showcasing music performed on instruments made from ice. Terje Isungset is the founder of the ice music as a phenomenon, and he has been travelling around the whole world with ice music concerts since 1999. Isungset had the idea of making a festival where everyone participating must create their art using only ice and snow. This requirement allowed for a pool of creativity among musicians, dancers, and other artists. In recent years, several students from the University of Bergen have been participating in the program as well. Isungset is in charge of the record label All Ice Records, and the festival cooperates with this label in producing ice music. AIR distributes their own music on all digital platforms, and are aiming to release at least one album per year, with one release at the first full moon of each year. The festival takes place in Ål, a small village close to Hardangervidda in Norway. Since 2006, the concert venue has been moved around several times, from Geilo to Finse - and now Ål. The stages are built from scratch every year, which is a major art project completed by the students from UiB.

Profile 
With the ice as the foundation for the festival, the program is entirely tailored around it. Nevertheless, every version of the festival is different. Every year, a new "instrument of the year" is made. Over the years, this has included the ice-kantele, ice-didgeridoo, ice-harp, ice-udu, ice-drum, ice-balafon, ice-hardanger fiddle, tub-ice, ice-leik, ice-bass, ice-ofon, ice-trumpet, ice-horn and ice-percussion. The festival focuses strongly on music, but the festival is also meant to highlight a focus on the climate crisis, as melting icecaps is one of the clearest signs of global warming. Bjerknes Centre for Climate Research in Bergen is doing research on global warming, and the festival cooperates with scientists, who give lectures during the festival.
Many various musicians have participated in the festival over the years, including Arve Henriksen, Anders Jormin‚ Miss Tati, Eirik Glambek Bøe and Sara Marielle Gaup. Complete artist overview found below. The musicians cover many different genres, from folk music and jazz to pop and R&B, and they all have different origins. Their collaboration at the Ice Music Festival creates music like no other.

Press coverage 
Various press from Norway and the rest of the world have visited and documented the Ice Music Festival:

Norway
Bergens Tidende, Drammens Tidende, Verdens Gang, NRK, TV 2, Aftenposten, Ringerikes Blad, Bergensavisen, Hallingdølen, Radio Hallingdal‚ Hytta Vår. 
Europe
Deutsche Welle, Die Zeit, Südwest Presse, GEO, Jazzism, BBC, BBC Music Jazz, Financial Times, The Guardian, fRoots, Jazzwise
 
Others HBO,

Artists 
 2017
 Bergen Academy of Art and Design
 Ivar Kolve: Ice-percussion and ice-marimba
 Bjørn Tomren: Yodelling
 Grzegorz Piotrowsk: Ice-saxophone
 Steinar Raknes: Ice-bass
 Snorre Bjerck: Ice-percussion
 Minna Raskinen and Anita Lehtola- Tollin: Ice-kantele
 Thomas T. Dahl: Ice-guitar
 Fieh (Sofie Tollefsbøl, Ola Øverby, Andreas Rukan & Lyder Øvreås Røed): Vocals, ice-percussion, ice-bass and ice-trumpet
 Maria Skranes: Vocals and ice-percussion
 Terje Isungset: Ice-percussion

 2016
 Martin Halla: Vocals
 Ivar Kolve: Ice-percussion & ice-marimba
 Kristin Voreland: Icedecoration
 Snorre Bjerck: Ice-percussion
 Jon Halvor Bjørnseth 
 Maria Skranes: Vocals & ice-percussion
 Daniel Herskedal: TubIce (Ice Tuba)
 Helge Andreas Norbakken: Ice-percussion
 Trio Medieval: Anna Maria Friman, Berit Opheim, & Linn Andrea Fuglseth: Vocals
 Arve Henriksen: Ice-trumpet & improvised vocals 
 Mamadou Diabate: Ice-percussion
 Miss Tati: Vocals
 Gawain Hewitt 
 Johannes Lundberg: Ice-bass
 Terje Isungset: Ice-percussion

 2015
 Sigurd Rotvik Tunestveit: Vocals
 Margit Myhr: Langeleik, lyre & vocals
 Steinar Mossige: Ice-percussion
 Eilif Gundersen: Ice-horn
 Sigurd Ytre-Arne: Electronics and sampling 
 Trio Medieval/ Anna Maria Friman, Berit Opheim, & Linn Andrea Fuglseth: Vocals
 Terje Isungset: Ice-percussion 
 Arve Henriksen:Ice-trumpet & improvised vocals 
 Anders Jormin: Ice-bass 
 Helge Norbakken: Ice-drums
 Jan Bang: Live sampling
 Stein Arne Rimehaug: Ice-udu 
 Lena Nymark: Vocals
 Therese Skauge: Dance

2014
 Andreas Aasberg: Dance
 Eilif Gundersen: Ice-horn 
 Eldbjørg Raknes: Vocals 
 Frode Eggen: Telling
 Rob Waring: Iceofon
 Svante Henryson: Ice-cello
 Katarina Henryson: Vocals
 Arve Henriksen: Ice-trumpet & improvised vocals 
 Anna Maria Friman: Vocals
 Sidsel Walstad: Ice-harp
 Lena Nymark: Vocals
 Bill Covitz: Instrument-maker
 Terje Isungset: Ice-percussion

2013
 Arve Henriksen: Ice-trumpet & improvised vocals 
 Hilmar Jensson: Ice-guitar and electronics
 Lena Willemark: Vocals 
 Leo Svensson Sander: Ice-cello
 Terje Isungset: Ice-percussion

2012

2011
 Aastad Bråten: Ice-langeleik (Norwegian folk music instrument)
 Solfrid Nestegard Gjeldokk: Vocals
 Bram Stadhouders: Ice-guitar and electronics
 Fatma Sidan: Vocals
 Mari Kvien Brunvoll: Vocals and ice-langeleik
 Terje Isungset: Ice-percussion

2010
 Helene Bøksle: Vocals
 Sidsel Walstad: Ice-harp
 Lena Nymark: Vocals
 Sofia Breimo and Johannes Blomquist: Performance
 Terje Isungset: Ice-percussion

2009
 Sidsel Walstad: Ice-harp
 Lena Nymark: Vocals
 St. Hallvard-guttene: Boys Choir
 Flukt: Art/dancing
 Helene Bøksle: Vocals
 Nils Økland: Ice-fiddle
 Vinterdvale: Sami duet 
 Sara Marielle Gaup: Joik
 Terje Isungset: Ice-percussion

2008
 Karin Park: Vocals
 David Park
 Karl Seglem: Ice-horn
 Eilif Gundersen: Ice-horns
 Peter Paelinck: Ice-didgeridoo
 Peter Wasilewski
 Eldgrim Springgard: Theater
 Ann Beate Skavhaug: Visual arts
 Iris Almås Tangeraas: Dance
 Sara Marielle Gaup: Joik
 Terje Isungset: Ice-percussion

2007
 Anneli Drecker: Vocals
 Espen Jørgensen: Ice-guitars
 Stefan Marb: Dance
 Lars Inge Tverberg
 Per Jørgensen: Ice-trumpet and vocals
 Märtha Louise: Storytelling
 Carlos Negreiros, Robertinho Silva, Lidia Pinheiro, Lasaro Insquierdo Gomes, Ceilo de Caravalho: Ice-percussion and dancing
 Therese Skauge: Dancing
 Terje Isungset: Ice-percussion

2006
 Unni Løvlid: Vocals
 Sidsel Endresen: Vocals
 Children from local school: Ice-percussion
 Terje Isungset: Ice-percussion

References

External links 
 
 Instagram
 Facebook

Music festivals in Norway
2006 establishments in Norway
Culture in Buskerud
Music festivals established in 2006